The following is a list of banks in Austria (as of 14 November 2019), as well as those that are defunct:

Banks 

Addiko Bank
Allianz Investmentbank
AlpenBank
Anglo Irish Bank
Austrian AAB Bank AG
Autobank AG
Banco do Brasil
Bank Austria Wohnbaubank AG
Bank für Tirol und Vorarlberg
Bank Gutmann
Bank of China
Bank Winter & Co
Bankhaus Denzel AG
Bankhaus Carl Spängler & Co
Bankhaus Krentschker & Co
Bankhaus Schelhammer & Schattera
Bausparkasse der österreichischen Sparkassen
Bausparkasse Wüstenrot
BAWAG P.S.K.
BAWAG P.S.K. Wohnbaubank
BMW Austria Bank
BKS Bank
BNP Paribas
BNP Paribas SA
Brüll Kallmus Bank
Capital Bank International-GRAWE Group
card complete Service Bank
Citibank Europe
Commerzbank (Schweiz) Private Banking
Commerzialbank Mattersburg im Burgenland
Credit Suisse (Luxembourg)
Deniz Bank
Deutsche Bank AG Filiale Wien
DolomitenBank Osttirol-Westkärnten
easybank
Erste Bank der Österreichischen Sparkassen
Erste Bank
European American Investment Bank
FCA Bank
FIL Fondsbank GmbH (Wien)
flatex Bank
Ford Bank Austria
Generali Bank
Hellobank BNP Paribas Austria
HYPO NOE Landesbank für Niederösterreich und Wien

HYPO TIROL BANK
Hypo Vorarlberg Bank
HYPO-BANK BURGENLAND
ICBC Austria Bank
IMMO-BANK AG
ING-DiBa Austria
Kathrein & Co. Privatgeschäftsbank
Kommunalkredit Austria
Landes-Hypothekenbank Steiermark
LEASFINANZ Bank
LGT Bank
Liechtensteinische Landesbank (Österreich)
Marchfelder Bank eG
Mercedez-Benz Bank GmbH
Mizuho Bank Europe NV
MUFG Bank (Europe)
NOTARREUHANDBANK AG
Oberbank
Oberösterreichische Landesbank AG
Österreichische Entwicklungsbank AG
Österreichische Kontrollbank
Österreichische Nationalbank
Österreichische Ärzte- und Apothekerbank
Österreichische Verkehrskreditbank
PARTNER BANK
paybox Bank
Porsche Bank
Posojilnica Bank eGen
PSA Bank Österreich
Raiffeisen Bank International
Raiffeisen Bausparkasse
Raiffeisen Centrobank AG
Raiffeisen Wohnbaubank AG
Raiffeisen-Landesbank Steiermark AG
Raiffeisen Landesbank Tirol
Raiffeisenlandesbank Burgenland und Revisionsverband eGen
Raiffeisenlandesbank Kärnten
Raiffeisenlandesbank Niederösterreich-Wien
Raiffeisenlandesbank Oberösterreich
Raiffeisenlandesbank Vorarlberg
Raiffeisenverband Salzburg eGen
RCI Banque SA
s Wohnbaubank AG
SALZBURGER LANDES-HYPOTHEKENBANK AG
Santander Consumer Bank GmbH

Sberbank Europe Group
Schoellerbank
Société Générale Zweigniederlassung Wien
SPAR-FINANZ BANK AG
Standard Chartered Bank (Wien)
start:bausparkasse AG
State Street Bank International GmbH Filiale Wien
Steyler Bank GmbH
TeamBank Österreich
UBS Europe SE (Österreich)
UniCredit Bank AG (Wien)
UniCredit CAIB
Vakifbank International
Volksbank Kärnten eG
Volksbank Niederösterreich AG
Volksbank Oberösterreich AG
Volksbank Raiffeisenbank Oberbayern Südost eG (Salzburg)
Volksbank Salzburg eG
Volksbank Steiermark AG
Volksbank Tirol AG
VOLKSBANK VORARLBERG e. Gen.
VOLKSBANK WIEN AG
Volkskreditbank
VTB Bank (Europe) SE (Wien)
Walser Privatbank AG
Western Union International Bank
Wiener Privatbank Immobilieninvest
WSK Bank AG
Zürcher Kantonalbank Österreich AG

Defunct banks 

3-Banken Wohnbaubank AG
Adria Bank
Bank Vontobel Österreich
Deutsche Bank
Dexia Kommunalkredit Bank
Europe Arab Bank
Factor-Bank
Hypo Alpe Adria Bank International
Hypo Noe Landesbank
Hypo-Wohnabubank

ING Group
Intermarket Bank
Internationale Bank für Außenhandel
intesa Sanpaolo S.p.a.
Joh. Berenberg, Gossler & Co. KG
KA Finanz AG
Liechtensteinische Landesbank (Österreich)
Macquarie Bank International
Mezzanin Finanzierungs AG
Österreichische Hotel- und Tourismusbank GmbH

Österreichische Exportfonds GmbH
Raiffeisen-Leasing Bank AG
Raiffeisen Zentralbank
SIX Payment Service
Sparkasse Allgäu Hauptzweigstelle Riezlern
Svenska Handelsbanken
The Royal Bank of Scotland plc. Filliale Wien
Valartis Bank
VR-Bank Braunau
VTB Bank

References

 
Austria
Lists of companies of Austria by industry
Austria